Hősök tere (Heroes' Square) is a station of the yellow M1 line of the Budapest Metro under Hősök tere. It was formerly called Aréna út Station. The station was opened on 2 May 1896 as part of the inaugural section of the Budapest Metro, between Vörösmarty tér and Széchenyi fürdő. This section, known as the Millennium Underground Railway, was the first metro system in continental Europe. In 2002, it was included into the World Heritage Site "Budapest, including the Banks of the Danube, the Buda Castle Quarter and Andrássy Avenue".

Állatkert metro station, existed between Hősök tere and Széchenyi fürdő from 1896 to 1973.

Connections

Bus: 20E, 30, 30A, 105, 178, 230
Trolleybus: 72M, 75, 79M

References

M1 (Budapest Metro) stations
Railway stations opened in 1896
1896 establishments in Hungary